Marcus is a city in Cherokee County, Iowa, United States. The population was 1,079 at the time of the 2020 census.

History
The first building in Marcus was erected in 1871. Marcus was incorporated on May 15, 1882.

Geography
Marcus is located at  (42.822892, -95.804894).

Demographics

2010 census
As of the census of 2010, there were 1,117 people, 494 households, and 310 families living in the city. The racial makeup of the city was 98.0% White, 1.3% Native American, 0.1% Asian, and 0.6% from two or more races. Hispanic or Latino of any race were 0.7% of the population.

There were 494 households, of which 24.7% had children under the age of 18 living with them, 52.0% were married couples living together, 7.7% had a female householder with no husband present, 3.0% had a male householder with no wife present, and 37.2% were non-families. 34.0% of all households were made up of individuals, and 20.9% had someone living alone who was 65 years of age or older. The average household size was 2.20 and the average family size was 2.78.

The median age in the city was 48.5 years. 22.3% of residents were under the age of 18; 4.9% were between the ages of 18 and 24; 17.7% were from 25 to 44; 28.6% were from 45 to 64; and 26.6% were 65 years of age or older. The gender makeup of the city was 47.3% male and 52.7% female.

2000 census
As of the census of 2000, there were 1,139 people, 477 households, and 300 families living in the city. The racial makeup of the city was 98.42% White, 0.35% Native American, 0.61% Asian, and 0.61% from two or more races. Hispanic or Latino of any race were 0.44% of the population.

There were 477 households, out of which 26.4% had children under the age of 18 living with them, 55.3% were married couples living together, 5.2% had a female householder with no husband present, and 36.9% were non-families. 33.8% of all households were made up of individuals, and 23.3% had someone living alone who was 65 years of age or older. The average household size was 2.28 and the average family size was 2.94.

Age spread:  22.7% under the age of 18, 5.7% from 18 to 24, 23.2% from 25 to 44, 19.8% from 45 to 64, and 28.7% who were 65 years of age or older. The median age was 44 years. For every 100 females, there were 89.8 males. For every 100 females age 18 and over, there were 83.9 males.

The median income for a household in the city was $37,604, and the median income for a family was $45,500. Males had a median income of $31,250 versus $19,167 for females. The per capita income for the city was $19,381. About 6.4% of families and 7.8% of the population were below the poverty line, including 9.0% of those under age 18 and 10.7% of those age 65 or over.

Education
It is within the Marcus-Meriden-Cleghorn Community School District. The district formed on July 1, 1993 as a result of the merger of the Marcus and Meriden-Cleghorn school districts.

Notable people

 Bruce Dreckman, Major League Baseball umpire
 Donald Eugene O'Brien, United States district judge
 Oscar L. Olson, third President of Luther College
 Robert E. Smylie,  24th Governor of Idaho; born in Marcus

References

siouxcityjournal.com

External links
 Official City Website Portal style website, Government, Business, Library, Recreation and more
 Marcus Historical Society
 City-Data.com Comprehensive Statistical Data and more about Marcus
 ePodunk

Cities in Cherokee County, Iowa
Cities in Iowa